Silvena Rowe (née Lauta, born in Plovdiv, Bulgaria) is a Bulgarian chef, food writer, television personality and restaurateur.

Biography
Rowe was born in Plovdiv to a Bulgarian mother and a Turkish father. Rowe's father, who was a newspaper editor of the largest [citation or source needed?] Bulgarian newspaper, Bulgarianised his name due to Bulgaria's communist government. He instilled in Rowe a love of cooking and passed down the traditions of the Ottoman cuisine.  At the age of 19, she moved to London. Silvena cooked in the kitchen of the Notting Hill bookshop Books for Cooks, which led her to cook for Princess Michael of Kent, Ruby Wax and Tina Turner. She also met Malcolm Gluck and the two began to write a regular food column for The Guardian newspaper. In 2007, she was the food consultant on David Cronenberg’s 2007 film Eastern Promises. She has become a regular guest on the BBC's Saturday Kitchen and ITV's This Morning. In 2007, her book Feasts won the Glenfiddich Food and Drink Award. After her father's death she wanted to rediscover her heritage so she travelled through Turkey, Syria, Lebanon and Jordan tracing her Ottoman roots; this resulted in her cookbook Purple Citrus and Sweet Perfume.

On 7 June 2011, her restaurant Quince opened at The May Fair Hotel in Mayfair, London. Her restaurant is influenced by her Turkish heritage- homage to her grandfather Mehmed, who used to cook the dishes for her father. Currently Silvena shares her time between Dubai, Sofia, New York and London.

Silvena Rowe is also a Charlton Athletic Supporter.

Awards
2007: Glenfiddich Food and Drink Award-London
2011: Gourmand Award - Paris
2017: Commitment to Healthy Eating, Time Out Dubai Restaurant Awards- Dubai

Television appearances
Food Network"Chopped" guest judge S18 Episode 225 05/13/2014
 BBC One's Saturday Kitchen, a regular guest
 BBC Two's Country Show Cook Off S01 E16-20 (2013)
 ITV This Morning
 Let's Dance for Comic Relief
 Screen expert/judge on BBC Young Chef of the Year (2009)
 Come Dine with Me
 Great Food Live
 Soapstar Superchef
 Time Machine Chefs
 A bit of salt - bTV (2013)
 Masterchef Bulgaria on bTV - Judge in Season 5 (2019), Season 6 (2020) and Season 7 (2021)

Books
Supergrub: Dinner-party Bliss on a Budget, HarperCollins, (2004)
Feasts: Food for Sharing from Central and Eastern Europe, Mitchell Beazley, (2006)
The Eastern and Central European Kitchen: Contemporary & Classic Recipes, Interlink, (2008)
Purple Citrus and Sweet Perfume: Cuisine of the Eastern Mediterranean, Hutchinson, (2010)
Orient Express, Hutchinson, (2011)
My Kitchen (Моята кухня), A&T Publishing, (2021)

References

External links
 
 Omnia By Sylvena - An interview with Sylvena Rowe

Living people
British chefs
Bulgarian chefs
Food writers
Bulgarian emigrants to England
Bulgarian people of Turkish descent
Writers from Plovdiv
British people of Turkish descent
1967 births